Trevor Gordon Grunnill (19 May 1948 – 10 January 2013) was a British-Australian singer, songwriter and musician.  He was a member of the late-1960s group the Marbles, whose biggest hit was the UK No. 5 "Only One Woman".

Early life 
Gordon was born in Blackpool, Lancashire, England, as Trevor Gordon Grunnill. He emigrated to Sydney, Australia, with his family in the late 1950s.

Career 
While still in high school, Gordon found work as a boy singer on the popular "Johnny O'Keefe" TV show leading to an exclusive contract with ABC, the Australian Television Network. This led to many live and TV appearances and Gordon was eventually made the host of his own Saturday afternoon kid's television program. During this time he met and befriended Barry, Maurice and Robin Gibb who were finding their own success in Australia as the Bee Gees. Gordon played lead guitar on several early Bees Gees tracks that appeared on the Bee Gees first album, The Bee Gees Sing and Play 14 Barry Gibb Songs. Gordon secured a record contract with Leedon Records and released the singles, "House Without Windows" and "And I'll Be Happy" (both songs written by Barry Gibb and credited to 'Trevor Gordon and the Bee Gees'), In 1965, Gordon recorded other Barry Gibb compositions: "Little Miss Rhythm and Blues" and "Here I Am". After returning to London in 1967, Gordon teamed up musically with his first cousin Graham Bonnet and eventually the pair became a musical duo called the Marbles. Not long after Gordon reconnected with his old mates, the Bee Gees, by now also in London and fast becoming international recording stars. The Gibbs helped Gordon and Bonnet secure a recording contract with the Australian record impresario, Robert Stigwood. Barry Gibb, Robin Gibb and Maurice Gibb wrote six songs for the Marbles and also provided some background vocals on their recordings, the most successful being the hit, "Only One Woman". With Bonnet's powerful vocals taking over the Marbles sound, Gordon felt under utilized and the duo soon disbanded. Gordon secured a contract with Polydor Records in London and released one album called Alphabet. Gordon was also a cast member of the Billy Cotton TV program in the UK before giving up performing and becoming a music teacher.

The Marbles were typical one-hit wonders because "Only One Woman" became their one and only major hit. It reached number 5 in the UK Singles Chart in November 1968, Following the release of the group's debut single, Bonnet made a remark to a reporter as to "Only One Woman" being a bit boring, angering Barry. Their second single "The Walls Fell Down" only reached number 28 in the same chart. But in the Netherlands it was more successful, where it reached number 3 in their Top 40 in April 1969.

Later years and death 
In 1970, Gordon released his first and only solo album Alphabet on Polydor Records. He later became a high school music teacher.

On 10 January 2013, after not being heard from for several weeks, Gordon was found dead in his London flat. His high school friend, singer/film director, Peter Foldy, called London police from Los Angeles, asking them to check up on Gordon. Says Foldy in a press release: "Trevor was a sweet, funny guy with tons of talent. He will be missed." Before his death, Gordon had published a book called Caged for Jazz Guitar – A Chord Shaped Approach to Jazz Mastery. The cause of death has not been announced pending an autopsy by the West London coroner's office in Fulham, but Gordon's death was thought to be from natural causes.

Discography 
Studio albums
 Alphabet (1970)

Singles
"House Without Windows"
"Little Miss Rhythm and Blues"

References 

1948 births
2013 deaths
People from Skegness
British soft rock musicians
English male singer-songwriters
English emigrants to Australia
Australian male singer-songwriters
Rhythm guitarists
20th-century Australian  male singers
20th-century British male singers